The West Australian Football Hall of Fame was created in 2002 to recognise and enshrine those who have made a significant contribution to Australian rules football in Western Australia. People eligible for inclusion are players, coaches, umpires, administrators and media representatives.

The inductees are chosen under guidelines which have been established by the West Australian Football Commission and in 2003 a Hall of Fame Selection Committee was made. The first induction into the Hall of Fame took place on 21 March 2004.

Those with the most significant contribution to West Australian football are elevated to 'Legend Status' and are listed below in bold. Currently there are 14 legends.

2004
81 inductees:

 Ron Alexander
 Malcolm Atwell
 Ken Bagley
 Bill Bateman
 Reg Brentnall
 Mal Brown
 Dick Buchanan (Media)
 Gary Buckenara
 Haydn Bunton, Jr.
 Haydn Bunton, Sr.
 Fred Buttsworth
 Bud Byfield (Administrator)
 Barry Cable
 Hugh 'Bonny' Campbell
 Ross Capes (Umpire)
 Derek Chadwick
 Geoff Christian (Media)
 David Christy
 Jack Clarke
 Henry "Ivo" Crapp (Umpire)
 Bill Dempsey
 George Doig
 Jerry Dolan
 Ross Elliott (Media)
 Graham Farmer
 Mike Fitzpatrick
 Brian Foley

 John Gerovich
 Ross Glendinning
 Barney Grecian
 Arthur Green
 H. B. Grosvenor (administrator)
 Brad Hardie
 Keith Harper
 Stan Heal
 Ern Henfry
 Ross Hutchinson (Coach)
 Ken Hunter
 Carlisle Jarvis
 Frank Jenkins
 Paddy Knox
 Johnny Leonard
 Clive Lewington
 Steve Marsh
 Denis Marshall
 Phillip Matson
 Les McClements
 Jack McDiarmid
 John McIntosh
 Merv McIntosh
 Guy McKenna
 Stephen Michael
 George Moloney
 Ray Montgomery (Umpire)

 Graham Moss
 Bernie Naylor
 Billy Orr (administrator)
 Tom Outridge
 George Owens
 Brian Peake
 Maurice Rioli
 Austin Robertson, Jr.
 Pat Rodriguez (Administrator)
 Norm Rogers
 Ray Schofield
 Ray Scott
 Jack Sheedy
 Keith Slater
 Ray Sorrell
 Frank Sparrow
 Val Sparrow
 Max Tetley
 John Todd
 William 'Digger' Thomas
 Albert Thurgood
 William 'Nipper' Truscott
 Ted Tyson
 Bill Walker
 Mel Whinnen
 Robert Wiley
 John Worsfold

2005
10 inductees:

 Sydney 'Sammy' Clarke
 Jim Craig
 Larry Duffy
 Dean Kemp

 Laurie Kettlewell
 Chris Mainwaring
 Steve Malaxos
 Gerard Neesham

 Wally Stooke (Administrator)
 Peter Sumich

2006
8 inductees:

 Greg Brehaut
 Deverick 'Mick' Cronin
 Les Fong

 Doug Green
 Ted Kilmurray
 Peter Matera

 Phil Narkle
 Charlie Tyson

2007
9 inductees:

 Simon Beasley
 Merv Cowan (Administrator)
 Peter Featherby

 Ted Flemming
 Brian France
 Jim Gosnell

 John Guhl
 Graham Melrose
 Peter Spencer

2008
9 inductees:

 Ken Armstrong (player-coach)
 Leon Baker
 George Grljusich (Media)

 Dave Ingraham
 Glen Jakovich
 Ken McAullay

 Ian Miller (player-coach)
 Henry Sharpe
 John K. Watts

2009
9 inductees:

 Jim Conway
 John Lussick (Administrator)
 Darrell Panizza

 Alan Preen
 Charles Sweetman
 Ron Tucker

 Alan Watling
 Nicky Winmar
 Dave Woods

2010
9 inductees:

 Mark Bairstow
 John Cooper
 Percy Johnson

 Dwayne Lamb
 Gary Malarkey
 Terry Moriarty

 Les Mumme
 Frank Treasure
 Wally Price

2011
6 inductees:

 Duggan Anderson
 Don Marinko, Sr.
 Alf Moffat (administrator)

 George Prince
 Garry Sidebottom
 Peter Tannock (administrator)

2012
6 inductees:

 Ben Allan
 Ashley McIntosh
 John O'Connell

 Herbie Screaigh
 Grant Vernon (umpire)
 Barry White

2013
6 inductees:

 Peter Bell
 Chris Lewis
 Frank Hopkins

 Tom Wilson
 George Young
 Ray Richards

2015
Eight inductees:

 Kevin Clune 
 Oliver Drake Brockman (media)
 Tom Grljusich
 Paul Hasleby

 Syd Jackson
 Stan Nowotny
 Con Regan
 John Wynne

2017
Ten inductees:

 Mike Ball (Umpire) 
 Simon Black 
 Peter Bosustow 
 Joel Corey 
 Charles Doig 

 Alan Johnson
 Derek Kickett
 Keith Narkle
 Bob Shields
 Frank Walker

2019
Six inductees, and Stephen Michael elevated to Legend status:

 Dean Cox 
 Darren Glass
 Chris Judd

 John Loughridge 
 Warren Ralph
 Jack Simons (administrator)

References

External links
Hall of Fame West Australian Football Commission website
WA Football Hall of Fame inductees

West Australian Football League
Australian rules football in Western Australia
Australian rules football museums and halls of fame
Awards established in 2002
Halls of fame in Western Australia
2002 establishments in Australia
Australian rules football-related lists